Forestville is a town in the Côte-Nord region of Quebec, Canada. The city operates the Forestville Airport.

Forestville is known for its hunting and fishing: moose hunting season is popular and there are many lakes and rivers to fish in as well as beaches and camping spots for the summer and cross country skiing in the winter. It is also host to the Boréal Loppet which is a cross-country skiing race with varying distances including 60 km. It also hosted the longest cross-country ski race in the world, at 103 km, from 2005 to 2011.

History
The area was well known to the First Nations, while the first European settlers arrived in 1844 following the construction of a sawmill by Edward Selvin, of Les Éboulements. In 1849, the mill was sold to William Price. One of the superintendents of the Price Company was Grant William Forrest (died November 15, 1878), after whom the new settlement was named. As written by Surveyor P.H. Dumais in 1873, the little village, "with its chapel and its windmills", was originally spelled Forrest-Ville, but the English version of his text showed the spelling Forestville. Being at the mouth of the Sault aux Cochons River, the place was also alternatively known as Sault-au-Cochon.

The Price Company owned large tracts of land in the area and prospered between 1870 and 1885, but went into decline about 1885, leading to the mill's closure in 1890. In 1937, the Forestville Post Office opened. That same year the forest industry was revitalized when the Anglo-Canadian Pulp & Paper Mills Company built a new mill, and in 1942, built the Arboriduc log flume that carried logs for several kilometers to the port at the mouth of the Sault aux Cochons River. Subsequently, the Town of Forestville and the Municipality of Saint-Luc-de-Laval were established in 1944 and in 1950 respectively.

In 1980, Forestville and Saint-Luc-de-Laval were merged to form the new Town of Forestville.

Demographics 

Population trend:
 Population in 2021: 2892 (2016 to 2021 population change: -6.1%)
 Population in 2016: 3081
 Population in 2011: 3270 
 Population in 2006: 3543
 Population in 2001: 3748
 Population in 1996: 3894
 Population in 1991: 3946

Mother tongue:
 English as first language: 0.3%
 French as first language: 99.1%
 English and French as first language: 0%
 Other as first language: 0.6%

Climate
Forestville has a humid continental climate (Dfb under the Köppen climate classification). Summers are mild to warm and rainy with cool nights. Winters are long, very cold, and extremely snowy.

See also
 List of cities in Quebec

References

External links
http://www.borealloppet.ca/

Cities and towns in Quebec
Incorporated places in Côte-Nord
La Haute-Côte-Nord Regional County Municipality